Epacris glacialis, commonly known as reddish bog-heath, is a species of flowering plant in the family Ericaceae and is endemic to south-eastern continental Australia. It is a prostrate to low-lying shrub with crowded, rhombus-shaped to broadly egg-shaped leaves with the narrower end towards the base, and tube-shaped, white flowers in small clusters near the ends of the branches.

Description
Flowering occurs from December to February.

Taxonomy
This epacris was first formally described in 1867 by Ferdinand von Mueller who gave it the name Epacris heteronema var. glacialis in Fragmenta Phytographiae Australiae. In 1976, 
Max Gray raised the variety to species status as Epacris glacialis in Contributions from the Herbarium Australiense. The specific epithet (glacialis) means "frozen" or "glacial".

Distribution and habitat
Epacris glacialis grows in herbfields and grassland near streams and bogs on rocky slopes in the Kosciuszko National Park in New South Wales and the Bogong High Plains in Victoria.

References

Flora of New South Wales
Flora of Victoria (Australia)
glacialis
Ericales of Australia
Taxa named by Ferdinand von Mueller
Plants described in 1867